Fabien Reboul (born 9 September 1995) is a French tennis player. He has a career-high ATP singles ranking of World No. 328 achieved on 17 December 2018. He also has a career-high doubles ranking of World No. 45 achieved on 27 February 2023. Reboul has won 13 ATP Challenger doubles titles, one at the 2019 Banja Luka Challenger, two in 2020 in Sibiu (Romania) and Campinas (Brazil), five in 2021 – including three in Italy and two in France, and six in 2022-2023, all partnering Sadio Doumbia.

Career
Reboul and Doumbia received a wildcard invitation into the main draw of their home tournament  at the 2022 Rolex Paris Masters making their debut at the Masters 1000 level.
The pair reached their first ATP final at the 2023 Córdoba Open.
Reboul reached the top 50 on 13 February 2023. Next they reached the semifinals at the 2023 Rio Open.

ATP career finals

Doubles: 1 (1 runner-up)

ATP Challenger and ITF Futures finals

Singles: 10 (3–7)

Doubles: 54 (38–16)

References

External links
 
 

1995 births
Living people
French male tennis players
Sportspeople from Toulouse